Live at the Louisiana Hayride is a compilation album credited to Johnny Cash and June Carter featuring live musical and comedy performances primarily by Carter, along with additional performances in duet with her future husband, Cash, dating from the early 1960s on the Louisiana Hayride radio program.

Track listing
"Thirty Days"
"Big Iron"
"Elvis Story & Poem"
"Gotta Travel On"
"He Don't Love Me Anymore"
"Bury Me Under the Weeping Willow"
"Poetry & Comedy Routine"
"Wildwood Flower"
"Where No One Stands Alone"
"Worried Man Blues"
"Poor 'Ol Heartsick Me"
"John Henry"
"The Heel"
"It Ain't Me, Babe" 
With Johnny Cash
"Ballad of a Teenage Queen"
With Johnny Cash

June Carter Cash albums
2003 live albums